Gosport is a town and non-metropolitan borough on the south coast of Hampshire, South East England. At the 2021 Census, its population was 81,952. Gosport is situated on a peninsula on the western side of Portsmouth Harbour, opposite the city of Portsmouth, to which it is linked by the Gosport Ferry. Gosport lies south-east of Fareham, to which it is linked by a Bus Rapid Transit route and the A32. Until the last quarter of the 20th century, Gosport was a major naval town associated with the defence and supply infrastructure of His Majesty's Naval Base (HMNB) Portsmouth. As such over the years extensive fortifications were created.

The Town area of the Borough, including Newtown, consists of the town centre, Stoke Road shopping area, Walpole Park, Royal Clarence Yard and three modern marinas: Royal Clarence, Gosport Marina and Haslar Marina. As part of the Renaissance of Portsmouth Harbour Millennium project, a large sundial, known as the Millennium Timespace, was installed on the harbour front in 2000.

Name
Though there are multiple theories which point towards the etymology of Gosport, it is widely purported to derive its name from "goose". An alternative etymology of "gorse" (from the bushes growing on local heathland) is not supported by the regional name for the plant, "furze". A third theory, claiming a derivation from "God's Port" is believed to be a 19th-century invention. This is, however, the slogan of Gosport as demonstrated on its emblem.

History
The Rowner area of the peninsula was settled by the Anglo-Saxons, and is mentioned in the Anglo Saxon Chronicle as Rughenor ("rough bank or slope"). Both Rowner and Alverstoke, the name coming from the point where the River Alver entered the Solent at Stokes Bay, were included in the Domesday Book. Rowner was the earliest known settlement of the peninsula, with many Mesolithic finds and a hunting camp being found, and tumuli on the peninsula investigated. Bronze Age items found in a 1960s construction in  included a hoard of axe heads and torcs. A three-celled dwelling unearthed during construction of the Rowner naval Estate in the 1970s points to a settled landscape. Next to the River Alver which passes the southern and western edge of Rowner is a Norman motte and bailey, the first fortification of the peninsula, giving a vantage point over the Solent, Stokes Bay, Lee-on-the-Solent and the Isle of Wight.

Gosport Town Hall, designed by W. H. Saunders and Sons, was completed in 1964.

The former Rowner naval married quarters estate, now mostly demolished, and HMS Sultan were built on a former military airfield, known first as RAF Gosport and later as HMS Siskin, which gives its name to the local infant and junior schools. The barracks at Browndown (Stokes Bay) were used in the ITV series Bad Lads' Army.

Government and Politics 
The borough is administered by Gosport Borough Council. Caroline Dinenage currently serves as the Conservative Party Member of Parliament for Gosport, and has done so since 2010, after gaining a 48.0% majority vote in the 2010 General Election.

Naval and military

Until the last quarter of the 20th century, Gosport was a major naval town associated with the defence and supply infrastructure of Her Majesty's Naval Base (HMNB) Portsmouth. As such over the years extensive fortifications were created. The first fortifications were in 1678 during the reign on Charles II. These consisted of two forts, Fort James and Fort Charles, and a series of bastions and double ditches to encircle the town, known as the Gosport Lines. During the Georgian period in 1751 and 1752 they were rebuilt, enlarged and extended. Further additions were made in response to the French invasion threat of 1779. By 1860, the Gosport Lines had 58 guns. No.1 Bastion, for example, had mounted 14 guns in brick lined emplacements firing over the parapet. The 1859 Royal Commission on the Defences of the United Kingdom proposed the completion of a line of forts to protect the outer approach to Gosport town, making the earlier defences redundant. However, they were retained to constrain any expansion of the town towards the new line of forts. From the 1890s road widening meant some parts of the ramparts and gates were demolished. Further sections were demolished in the 1920s and 1960s. Today, the little that remain are protected ancient monuments.

Most of the former naval and military installations have closed since the Second World War, leaving empty sites and buildings. In response to this, museums have opened, and many of the fortifications and installations (such as Fort Brockhurst, Priddy's Hard (formerly an Armament Depot, now the Explosion! Museum of Naval Firepower) and the Royal Navy Submarine Museum in Haslar Road) have been opened to the public as tourism and heritage sites. One of the more recent additions is the Diving Museum at No 2 Battery at Stokes Bay which is bidding to become the National Diving Museum for the British Isles.

Several sites have also been redeveloped to provide housing, including the New Barracks (opened 1859, renamed St George Barracks in 1947, having served as HMS St George during the Second World War; closed 1991), the Royal Clarence Victualling Yard (opened 1828 on the site of an earlier victualling facility, closed 1992) and Royal Hospital Haslar (formerly the last military hospital of the UK: opened as a Royal Naval Hospital in 1753, later served other armed forces personnel and latterly the wider community of Gosport; closed as a military hospital in March 2007, the NHS withdrew in 2009 and the hospital closed).

There has also been extensive redevelopment of the harbour area as a marina.

Graves of Turkish sailors 1850–51 
In November 1850, two ships of the Ottoman Navy, Mirat-ı Zafer and Sirag-i Bahri Birik, anchored off the Hardway near Gosport. The visit lasted several months and during this time some of the members of the crew contracted cholera and were admitted to Haslar Hospital for treatment, where most of them died. In addition, some other sailors died because of training accidents. In total 26 died and were laid to rest in the grounds of Haslar. At the turn of the 20th century the bodies were exhumed and transferred to the R.N. Military Cemetery, Clayhall Road, in Alverstoke.

Preparations for the D Day Landings 

In the first week of June 1944, tanks, scout cars and wheeled vehicles of the Sherbrooke Fusilier Regiment, Canadian Army loaded Landing craft tanks in Gosport. Convoys of vehicles had been carefully concealed from German discovery in the areas further inland, and in daylight on 3 June moved through Titchfield and Stubbington to G3 Hard on the Gosport waterfront. There, the M4 Sherman tanks were backed into position in preparation for the Channel crossing. The initial plan was for the invasion to begin on 5 June, but bad weather, with the various vessels riding at anchor off Calshot in the Solent, delayed the plans by one day.

Gallery of historic buildings

Naval

Military

Geography
The Town area of the Borough, including Newtown, consists of the town centre, Stoke Road shopping area, Walpole Park, Royal Clarence Yard and three modern marinas: Royal Clarence, Gosport Marina and Haslar Marina.

South of the centre is Haslar Creek, which flows into Portsmouth Harbour near the harbour mouth. The lowest part of Haslar Creek is called Haslar Lake; at its western end, the creek splits into two branches. These are called Workhouse Lake (the northern branch) and Stoke Lake (the southern branch). South East of Stoke Lake and along Gilkicker Point is the area of Clayhall.

West, Northwest and South of Stoke Lake is the district and village of Alverstoke. To the west of which is Browndown, where the River Alver flows into The Solent at Stokes Bay. Further west from Browndown point is the district of Lee-on-the-Solent with the former RNAS Daedalus which is now home to a hovercraft museum and several marine related businesses, and CEMAST College (Fareham College). It is also used as a base for glider clubs, light aeroplanes, HM Coastguard heliport and police aircraft.

In the west of Gosport is the naval base HMS Sultan. West of Sultan is the district of Rowner, which includes Alver Village.

There are several districts north, northwest and west of the town centre. These include areas that extend to the inland areas of the peninsula, Hardway (including Priddy's Hard and Forton Lake) Elson, Brockhurst, Bridgemary and Rowner. Hoeford (A32 Gosport Road) is the most northwesterly area within Gosport, and ends at the boundary with the Borough of Fareham.

Climate
The climate of Gosport is milder than that of the surrounding areas, winter frosts being light and short-lived and snow quite rare. Temperatures rarely drop much below freezing, because the peninsula has water to the south and east. Portsdown Hill also protects the town from the cold northerly winds during the winter months. Located on the south coast, Gosport also receives more sunshine per annum than most of the UK. The average maximum temperature in January is 8C with the average minimum being 3C. The average maximum temperature in July is 21C, with the average minimum being 14C. The record high temperature is 32C and record low is -9C.

The Met Office has a weather station at the M.R.S.C. in Lee-on-the-Solent.

Transport
Gosport has no railway station. However, it may be considered that the town does not require a railway station due to the ferry connection to Portsmouth Harbour. The Gosport Ferry provides quick access to Portsmouth Harbour railway station, terminus of the Portsmouth Direct Line to London. Due to heavy traffic (see below) this ferry is very well used. At one time the Gosport Ferry Company operated steam ferries, until the arrival in 1966 of two identical (and then very modern) diesel ferries, named Gosport Queen and Portsmouth Queen. In 1971 a third ferry called Solent Enterprise joined the fleet. She was a slightly larger, more luxurious version of the "Queens". The company now operates two new modern ferries along with the two 1966 veterans. The first was built in 2001 and is named Spirit of Gosport. After the retirement of the Solent Enterprise in 2003, a second modern and slightly larger ferry was added to the fleet and was named the Spirit of Portsmouth. All ferries have been able to carry cycles and motorcycles.

Gosport received its railway before Portsmouth, but it closed to passengers in 1953. In 1841 a railway opened between the London and Southampton Railway at  via  to Gosport, where a terminus was built to an Italianate design of Sir William Tite. Gosport railway station was intended to serve Portsmouth across the water, but was sited at Gosport away from the harbour because the railway company was not allowed to breach either the Hilsea Lines, defences at the northern end of Portsea Island protecting Portsmouth, or the Gosport Lines protecting depots such as Royal Clarence Yard.

An extension to Royal Clarence Yard was opened in 1846, and branch lines to Stokes Bay (open from 1863 to 1915), and to Lee-on-the-Solent (open to passengers 1894 to 1931). Due to declining traffic, the connection to Fareham was closed for passenger services in 1953 and to freight traffic in 1969, although trains to the armament depot in Frater ran until the late 1970s.

The trackbed of the former Gosport – Fareham railway is now an exclusive fast bus route and cycle lane. Tite's station building has been retained for its historical and architectural value and has been converted into a small number of residential properties and offices. The main gate in Spring Garden Lane has been opened up for vehicle access. A further development of six terraced homes has been built at the north western end of the site linking with George Street.

Being a peninsula town without a railway system, Gosport relies heavily upon the major A32 road in and out of the town. Plans existed in the 1970s to widen the road to accommodate expected increases in traffic flow, but this did not take place. In the early 1990s a computerised system controlling traffic lights along the route was installed to improve the rate of flow of traffic but this failed to work and had to be switched off since it could not cope with the traffic volumes.

The station site was linked with the South Hampshire Rapid Transit scheme, which would have made use of the former railway route. However, due to Government refusal to fund the scheme, it was formally abandoned in November 2006. During 2010, construction started on the same route to provide a rapid bus route between the Holbrook area of Gosport and the town of Fareham. Now completed, regular service buses between Gosport and Fareham divert onto the new route avoiding lengthy queues on the A32 and speeding up commuting time between the towns for bus passengers.  Gosport bus station serves the town.

Proposed Tunnel
In 1999, a study was undertaken by the Light Rail Transit Association in regard to a proposed tunnel connecting Gosport to Portsmouth, crossing under Portsmouth Harbour. The study proposed a 670m Immersed tube which would not require long closures of the harbour to construct, and would alleviate traffic congestion in Gosport and the surrounding area. The tunnel was intended for construction in 2002, but financial problems delayed the project. The government declined to fund the initiative in 2005.

Present day

The 2001 Census recorded 54,854 people in Gosport of working age between the ages of 16 and 74. The economic activity of the residents in the Gosport Borough was 46.7% were in full-time employment, 12.9% were in part-time employment, 6.1% were self-employed, 2.7% were unemployed, 2.5% were students with jobs, 2.5% were students without jobs, 14% were retired, 6.2% were looking after the home or family and 3.8% were permanently sick or disabled.

As part of the Renaissance of Portsmouth Harbour Millennium project, a large sundial, known as the Millennium Timespace, was installed on the harbour front in 2000. Its timekeeping is partially restricted each day by shadowing caused by large tower blocks either side of the 'timespace'. These towers, Seaward Tower and Harbour Tower, were built in 1963. Their surfaces are covered in mosaic murals designed by Kenneth Barden that rise the full height of the buildings and are illuminated at night. They were controversial initially but are now a tourist attraction. The tiles were produced by Poole Pottery. The International Festival of the Sea drew over 250,000 tourists to the Portsmouth Harbour area in 1998, 2001 and 2005. The most recent festival was held in 2007.

The Royal Navy maintains a presence in Gosport at HMS Sultan, which is the home of the Defence School of Marine Engineering (DSMarE) and the Royal Naval Air Engineering and Survival School (RNAESS). The Sultan site occupies  of land within a  perimeter and is the largest of the Royal Navy's training establishments, with around 3,000 service and civilian personnel when working at full capacity.

Education
The Borough of Gosport has the following schools and colleges:

Sixth form college 
 St Vincent Sixth Form College

Secondary schools 
 Bay House School which is a former grammar school, located near the coast, in Stanley Park. Bay House School also includes a sixth-form.
 Bridgemary Community School, located in Wych Lane.
Brune Park Community School is a performing arts college, with the Joe Jackson Theatre, named after the 1970s pop star and past Brune Park pupil.

Libraries
There are public libraries at Bridgemary, Elson, and at Gosport Discovery Centre. In 2020, Hampshire County Council announced plans to close the council-run Elson library. Following this, a bid was made to save the library from closure, following consultations with the community. The library reopened on 12 May 2021, operating as Elson Community Library and Hub, registered as a charity.

Culture

In November 2022 the Gosport Museum and Art Gallery opened in the old Gosport Grammar School building. The building had previously been the Gosport Museum from 1975, and then the Gosport Gallery and reference library. The museum is run by Hampshire Cultural Trust. It is part of the council's urban regeneration plans. One of the aims of Hampshire Cultural Trust is to get "the community back in. We want to get the building back into use and the public back into the High Street ... [and to attract people] who do not normally go to museums".

The town has a theatre, Thorngate Hall, which was opened in 1960. It is named after an earlier Thorngate Hall, on a different site in South Street, which was destroyed by bombing in the Second World War. The earlier hall was built in 1885 and funded by the Thorngate Trust.

The town had an earlier theatre, opened in 1923.

Sport
The town of Gosport has many sports clubs and organisations including boxing, judo, angling, rugby, cricket, football, model yachting, sailing, and hockey.

Gosport Borough F.C. play their home games at Privett Park and cater for players of either sex from age six upwards. The club play in the Southern Football League and represent the town at a national level in the FA Cup and FA Trophy. The area also has another Non-League football club Fleetlands F.C. who play at Lederle Lane Stadium.
RMLI Gosport F.C. were a former team to represent the town winning the 1910 FA Amateur Cup.

In 2018, in response to a large demand for amateur Saturday football, Rowner Rovers Football Club (known also as "The Ravens") was formed by Irishman, Timothy Stickland and the now Havant and Waterlooville Women's FC manager, Ben Evans. Evans left soon after the club's formation due to commitments with Southampton Football Club. The Ravens play in the Mid Solent Adult Football League (formerly the Portsmouth Saturday League) and are the only representative of Gosport in amateur Saturday football. Their kit comprises red and black stripes, black (originally grey) shorts, and black socks. In 2022, Stickland handed control of the club to James Dedman before retiring as Player/Manager/Chairman due to work and family commitments.

Gosport and Fareham Rugby Football Club has 6 senior sides, a Ladies team, and 10 youth sides. Gosport Borough Hockey Club, based at St Vincent College, has three Men's teams, a Ladies team and Junior teams.

Gosport Borough Cricket Club was formed in 1966 following the merger of Gosport Amateurs & Gosport C.C., and also play at Privett Park. They reached the ECB National Club Cricket Championship final at Lord's in 1980. Future England players Trevor Jesty & Phil Newport played for the club before moving on to first-class careers. In 2008 18 year old Chris Lynn was their overseas player, later going on to represent Australia in ODI & T20I matches. They currently run 4 adult league sides, and colts teams from Under 9 to Under 15.

Gosport also has two Synchronised Ice Skating teams who compete at national level competitions, including the British Synchronised Skating Championships. The club use Planet Ice Gosport to train.

Furthermore, Gosport has a model yachting lake which has national and international events held there every year. Boats sailed there include the Vane A class, Vane 36, 1 meter, multihull, dragon force and laser. Model yachting used to be one of the most popular sports in Britain. Now it is one of only a few lakes in the world that still races vane steered boats, the more traditional kind without remote control or electricity.

A greyhound racing track called the Gosport Greyhound and Whippet Track existed from April 1930 until June 1936 and held racing every Friday evening and Saturday afternoon. The racing was independent (not affiliated to the sports governing body the National Greyhound Racing Club) and was known as a flapping track, which was the nickname given to independent tracks. The stadium was located on the Forton Road and distances raced were mainly over 400 yards.

Gosport and Stokes Bay Golf Club is located on the Southern tip of the Gosport peninsula. The original 9-hole golf course was built in the late 19th century.

Tourism
The Gosport peninsula has  of waterfront on Portsmouth Harbour and The Solent. The pebble beach at Stokes Bay slopes steeply into the sea and offers views of the shipping going in and out of Portsmouth and Southampton and the many pleasure craft from the many marinas along The Solent and the Isle of Wight.

The town has three marinas: Gosport Marina, north of the Highstreet; Haslar Marina, south of the Highstreet near the former site of Royal Hospital Haslar; and Royal Clarence Marina which also has a Cruising Club.

The town has a strong military history – chiefly with the Royal Navy. The Royal Navy Submarine Museum has exhibits including  – the Royal Navy's first submarine and the Second World War submarine .

Explosion! tells the story of naval firepower from gunpowder to modern missiles. The museum is housed in historic buildings at Priddy's Hard, the Navy's former armaments depot, with views across Portsmouth Harbour.

Fort Brockhurst is one of the "Palmerston's Follies", built in the 1850s to defend Portsmouth Harbour against threats of a French invasion. A central exhibition explains Palmerston's plans to defend the key naval port. Nearby is the Gosport Aviation Heritage Museum, dedicated to the development of the Royal Air Force. The fort is owned by English Heritage.

Gosport is also home to Little Woodham, the 1642 Living History Village. The village exists to educate both children and adults about 17th century life at the outbreak of the English Civil War and is open for the public to meet the villagers at certain times throughout the year.

In September 2016, the Royal Navy Submarine Museum became the set for a scene in Transformers: The Last Knight, which starred . The filming brought many locals to see what was occurring.

Twin towns
 Royan, France

Notable people
See :Category:People from Gosport

Freedom of the Borough
The following people and military units have received the Freedom of the Borough of Gosport.

Individuals
 Alex Thomson: 11 April 2014.

Military Units
 The Engineering Training School Royal Navy: 1974.
 The Royal Marines: 10 November 2005.
 Royal Hospital Haslar: 28 March 2007.
 Ministry of Defence Hospital Unit Portsmouth: 8 March 2007.  
 33 Field Hospital 2nd Medical Brigade RAMC: 23 April 2010.
 , RN: 22 March 2013.

See also
 List of places of worship in the Borough of Gosport
 Gosport and Fareham Inshore Rescue Service
 "The Gosport Tragedy" (a broadside ballad)

References

 
 
 
  – history

External links

 Gosport Borough Council
 
 
 
 
 Gosport Museum and Art Gallery

 
Towns in Hampshire
Non-metropolitan districts of Hampshire
Populated coastal places in Hampshire
Unparished areas in Hampshire
Boroughs in England